Weapons is the fifth and final studio album by the Welsh alternative rock band Lostprophets. It was released through Epic Records on 2 April 2012. It was the first and only record featuring Luke Johnson on drums, after being with two other drummers previously, Mike Chiplin and Ilan Rubin (the latter of whom features in archive recordings included on the "deluxe edition" of Weapons, as well as the hidden track "Weapon" on all versions of the album). This was the last album to be released by the band before lead vocalist Ian Watkins was convicted of numerous sex offences, which led to their disbandment.

Just like their third studio album it features Latin on the front, which reads deus velox nex. When translated it reads God is swift death.

Writing and recording history
The band started writing new material after finishing The Betrayed Tour. The album was produced by Ken Andrews at Hollywood. Several songs were debuted before it official release date. "Bring Em' Down" was played live in the warm up shows for the 2011 V Festival, and was aired as the first single from Weapons on Zane Lowe's Hottest Record on 6 February 2012. "We Bring an Arsenal" made its debut on 25 February 2012.
The song "Better Off Dead" received its first radio play by BBC Radio 1's Zane Lowe as his "Hottest Record in the World". As of 6 January 2012 it was made available for download from the band's official website.

Release and promotion
This was Lostprophets' only studio release through Epic (UK) and Fearless (US) after leaving their long-time served record, Visible Noise. Lostprophets also announced an extensive tour of the UK and Ireland, consisting of 14 shows which commenced on the 15 April 2012 in Dublin and finished on the 4 May 2012 in London. It was released in the UK on 2 April 2012 and it was released in the US on 19 June 2012. Because the fourth studio album The Betrayed was not released in North America, it's the band's fourth released album in some regions. The "deluxe edition" of the albums contains three "Garage sessions" tracks, recorded in 2007 as demos for the ultimately-abandoned album sessions with John Feldmann prior to The Betrayed, with the track "Weapon" from the same sessions included as a hidden track on all versions of the album. Further more bonus tracks are found on the Japanese "deluxe edition". The US "deluxe edition" is different from the UK edition.
Lostprophets headlined the Warped Tour UK in November 2012.

Singles
The first single, "Bring 'Em Down", was released on 23 March 2012. "We Bring an Arsenal" was to be the second single, released on 4 June 2012, but was not released as a single. "Jesus Walks" was to be released as the next single on 10 September 2012, but again no official single was released. On 3 December 2012, Watkins tweeted, "En route to the big smoke to shoot our new musical video." When the band had previously debuted "Bring 'Em Down" on Zane Lowe's show in February, Watkins stated that the fourth single was to be a "power ballad". However, sixteen days after the video shoot, it was announced that Watkins had been arrested for a string of multiple sexual offenses against children. The video shot was for "Somedays" and was filmed at the I-Heart Studios in London, directed by Luke Reynolds. Watkins and Gaze were the only members of the band at the video shoot, as the rest of the band were in the USA at the time and were to be included using archive footage.

Reception

As of May 2012, the album held a normalised score of 56 out of 100 on Metacritic, indicating "mixed or average reviews", making it the lowest rated album released by the band to date. As a result, critics generally viewed the album as a decline in the band's career.

Allmusic stated that the fifth studio album strikes a nice balance between the metallic fury and desperation of their debut, The Fake Sound of Progress, and the slicker, more commercial sound of The Betrayed. It also has been compared with "chrome-drunk" classic of The Godfathers, with electro-metal of Muse, enthusiasm with Green Day.

Alternative Press states "With the exception of the cheesy posturing of 'We Bring An Arsenal' and the flat strains of 'Somedays,' every track has something going for it, even if it's only an occasional riff or lyrical hook....For now, this stands as another good if inessential addition to their catalog  a phrase that, for better or worse, applies to the majority of their output."

BBC Music and The Guardian similarly reviewed the album positively, with the same "us-against-the-world" feeling of the band's second studio album, Start Something.

Track listing

Personnel
Credits for Weapons adapted from liner notes.

Lostprophets
 Ian Watkins – lead vocals, art direction
 Lee Gaze – lead guitar
 Mike Lewis – rhythm guitar
 Stuart Richardson – bass guitar, co-production, additional engineered
 Jamie Oliver - piano, keyboards, samples, vocals
 Luke Johnson - drums, percussion

Additional musicians
 Ilan Rubin –  drums, percussion (Garage session tracks and "Weapon")

Production

 Ken Andrews – production, engineered, mixing, additional guitar, synth, backing vocals
 Justin Hopfer – co-production, additional engineered
 Romesh Dodabgoda – co-production, additional engineered
 Sean Curiel – assistant engineered
 Marco Ruiz – assistant engineered
 Rouble Kapoor – assistant engineered
 Liam Ross – assistant engineered
 Tom Manning – assistant engineered
 Brendan Davies – assistant engineered
 Aaron Rubin – A&R, production, mixing (tracks: 11–15 and "Weapon")
 Tom Baker – mastered
 Russell Lissack – production (track: 15)
 James Ellis – production (track: 15)
 Dick Beetham – mastered (tracks 11–17 and "Weapon")
 Dan Mandell – art direction
 Andrew Whitton – photography

Charts

Release history

References

External links

Weapons at YouTube (streamed copy where licensed)

Lostprophets albums
2012 albums
Epic Records albums